The 2004 National Hockey League All-Star Game was held on February 8, 2004, at the Xcel Energy Center in Saint Paul, home of the Minnesota Wild. The Eastern Conference defeated the Western Conference 6–4. This was the final All-Star Game until 2007.

All-Star weekend

Events 
The city of Saint Paul in honor of the All Star Game being held built the Ice Castle for the first time in over 20 years at the Saint Paul Winter Carnival right across the street from the Xcel Energy Center.

NHL YoungStars Game 
The YoungStars game, featuring rosters composed entirely of rookies and some second-year players, saw the Western Conference YoungStars defeat the Eastern Conference 7–3. Anaheim's Joffrey Lupul scored a hat trick, San Jose's Jonathan Cheechoo picked up four assists and Colorado goaltender Philippe Sauve was named the Game MVP, stopping 18 of 21 shots. It is notable that instead of a regular 5-on-5 hockey game, the YoungStars game is played in a four-on-four format with each roster consisting of six forwards, four defencemen, and one goaltender. The game was played in three 10-minute running-clock periods and a four-minute intermission between each period.

SuperSkills Competition 
The Eastern Conference were the overall victors of the SuperSkills Competition, in which select all-stars compete in various competitions, including a shootout, a relay race and a fastest skater competition. The East defeated the West 13–6. Panthers goaltender Roberto Luongo won the Goaltenders Competition, Islanders defenceman Adrian Aucoin won the Hardest Shot competition and Devils defenceman Scott Niedermayer won the Fastest Skater competition.

Individual Event winners 
 Puck Control Relay – Rick Nash (Columbus Blue Jackets)
 Fastest Skater – Scott Niedermayer (New Jersey Devils) - 13.783 seconds
 Accuracy Shooting – Jeremy Roenick (Philadelphia Flyers) - 4 hits, 4 shots
 Hardest Shot – Adrian Aucoin (New York Islanders) - 102.2 mph
 Goaltenders Competition – Roberto Luongo (Florida Panthers) - 1 GA, 12 shots

The game 
The Eastern Conference were struck with injuries as Scott Stevens and Wade Redden were forced to pull out of the game. Brian Rafalski and Pavel Kubina replaced the defensemen, respectively, putting the starting rosters at Ilya Kovalchuk, Joe Thornton and Martin St. Louis on offense, Scott Niedermayer and Stevens injury replacement Brian Rafalski on defense and Martin Brodeur in goal for the East, and Todd Bertuzzi, Mike Modano and Bill Guerin on offense, Rob Blake and Nicklas Lidstrom on defense and Marty Turco in goal for the West.

The Eastern Conference cruised to a 6–4 victory on goals by Adrian Aucoin, Daniel Alfredsson (who scored twice), Mark Messier, Gary Roberts and Ilya Kovalchuk. However, it was Joe Sakic of the Western Conference who walked away with MVP honors as he scored a hat trick. Coyotes forward Shane Doan also scored for the West.

Rosters

Notes

Scott Stevens was voted as a starter, but was unable to play due to injury. Brian Rafalski was selected as his replacement in the starting lineup.
Wade Redden was selected, but was unable to play due to injury. Pavel Kubina was named as his replacement.
Marian Hossa was selected, but was unable to play due to injury. Glen Murray was selected as his replacement.

Uniforms
For the first time, the NHL used All-Star uniforms inspired by the host team, and opted to go with a retro flavor. The uniforms were distinct for the lack of white - the Eastern Conference uniforms were cream-colored (officially the Minnesota Wild's "Minnesota Wheat" color) with red trim, while the Western Conference wore green jerseys with cream trim. In a departure from the overall retro theme of the uniforms, the names on the back of the jersey were in the Kabel typeface used by the Toronto Maple Leafs at the time.

Summary

 Referees: Blaine Angus, Stephen Walkom
 Linesmen: Scott Driscoll, Thor Nelson
 Television: ABC, CBC, SRC

All
National Hockey League All-Star Games
Sports in Minneapolis–Saint Paul